Andrea Martin Armani is the Ray Irani Chair in Engineering and Materials Science and Professor of Chemical Engineering and Materials Science at the USC Viterbi School of Engineering. She was awarded the 2010 Presidential Early Career Award for Scientists and Engineers from Barack Obama and is a World Economic Forum Young Global Leader.

Early life and education
Armani is from Memphis, Tennessee. She attended the St. Mary's Episcopal School and graduated in 1996. She was described by her school as being a "Renaissance woman", took part in Model United Nations and played the flute. She studied physics at the University of Chicago, graduating in 2001. She was the only girl in her physics class. She moved to the California Institute of Technology for her doctoral studies, majoring in applied physics with a minor in biology. From 2006 to 2008 Armani served as a Clare Boothe Luce postdoctoral researcher in biology and chemical engineering at Caltech. Her advisors were Scott E. Fraser and Richard Flagan. While there she worked on single-molecule detection, using a silica surface that is functionalised to bind a target molecule.

Career and research
Armani is interested in nonlinear materials and integrated optical devices, which are used in everything from diagnostics to telecommunications. When she was offered her position at University of Southern California, she delivered a hand-written acceptance letter to Yannis C. Yortsos. She is director of the W. M. Keck Photonics Cleanroom and John D. O’Brien Nanofabrication Laboratory. From 2010 to 2017, she was the Fluor Early Career Chair of Engineering, and in 2017, she was appointed the Ray Irani Chair in Chemical Engineering and Materials Science. She has appointments in Chemical Engineering and Materials Science, Biomedical Engineering, Electrical Engineering, Mechanical Engineering, and Chemistry.

Her research group is highly interdisciplinary, working from the fundamentals of material discovery and optics to applications in integrated optics and diagnostics. She used gold nanoparticles to create low power frequency combs, which can be used as high precision light sources in fields such as cybersecurity, chemical sensing and GPS. The gold nanoparticles increase the light that circulates in the device, allowing the microlaser to operate at a range of wavelengths at high intensity. She also works on hybrid organic-inorganic photonics which combine organic materials with conventional integrated photonic devices. In this work, she invented several new organic small molecules to improve optical device performance for Raman lasers and frequency comb generation. She invented a photo-responsive material and created a flexible indicator from a tri-layer polymer-based device, which changes colour when exposed to UV light. The colour change is due to the polymer irreversibly cleaving when exposed to UV-light. This device could be used in preventive healthcare to protect against skin cancer. She was supported by the Office of Naval Research to develop an interferometric optical biosensor. The proposed biosensor is able to detect DNA and bacteria. She developed a high-resolution polarimetric elastography instrument to characterise the mechanical properties of visco-elastic materials. This has been used to study the extracellular matrix in pancreatic tissue and porcine tissue.

Armani is interested in using optical devices for epigenetic investigations, and has developed a label-free sensor that can detect and quantify DNA methylation. The sensor incorporates a rare-earth element optical cavity to form a nanolaser. The heterodyned nanolaser sensors can be used to diagnose ovarian cancer as they are sensitive to RASSF1A and BRCA1 promoters. They compliment their experimental work with finite element method and finite-difference time-domain method modelling. In 2018 she announced a portable malaria screening device that can be used for rapid screening. The device uses a 633 nm laser to study hemozoin, a magnetic insoluble nanocrystal that forms when heme aggregates. The hemozoin nanoparticles strongly scatter light and can be moved using a magnet, which allows them to be identified by monitoring the intensity of light that passes through a sample.

Her lab group are not only involved with research, but actively engaged with the community, running engineering festivals, lab parties and sports days. Armani is a  Fellow of SPIE and Optica (formerly OSA), and has been a visiting lecturer of both societies since in 2009. She is the faculty advisor for the student chapters of SPIE and Optica at USC. She spent 2015 on sabbatical as a Northrop Grumman faculty fellow.

Awards and honors
Armani is a Fellow of the International Society for Optical Engineering and Optica.

2022 Robert E. Hopkins Leadership Award
2021 Fellow of the American Association for the Advancement of Science
2021 Fellow of the National Academy of Inventors
2017 Sigma Xi member
2015 World Economic Forum Young Global Leader
2014 Popular Science Brilliant 10
2013 Grainger Foundation Frontiers of Engineering
2011 USC Viterbi Junior Research Award
2010 White House Presidential Early Career Award for Scientists and Engineers
2010 National Institutes of Health Director's New Innovator Award
2010 USC Mellon Mentoring Award for Undergraduates
2010 Congressionally Directed Medical Research Program Young Investigator Award
2009 MIT Technology Review TR 35 Top 35 Innovators under 35
2009 Office of Naval Research Young Investigator Award
2008 SPIE Young Investigator Award
2007 California Institute of Technology Graduate Dean's Award for Community Service
2001 Sigma Xi award for Excellence in Research

References

External links 
 Armani on becoming interested in optics (video)
 Armani on her work in cancer research (video)

Year of birth missing (living people)
Living people
People from Memphis, Tennessee
American women engineers
American chemical engineers
Women chemical engineers
California Institute of Technology alumni
University of Chicago alumni
University of Southern California faculty
Fellows of Optica (society)
SPIE
Women in optics
American women academics
21st-century American women
Fellows of the National Academy of Inventors
Fellows of the American Association for the Advancement of Science